is a set of two 2D top-down role-playing video games in the Medabots series, developed and published by Natsume for Game Boy Advance. It is a remake of the Japan-exclusive title , which was released for the Game Boy Color in 1999. It was later re-released on the Wii U Virtual Console on October 1, 2015 in Europe, on December 10, 2015 for North America, and on January 27, 2016 in Japan.

Medabots is one of only three games in the series to be released outside Japan, the other two being Medabots AX and Medabots Infinity.

Plot
Ikki Tenryou is a young boy who's obsessed with Medabots, just like every other kid, however he doesn't have one yet. One day, his mother asks him to buy some dinner, but instead he gets talked into buying a Medabot instead with the money. However it turns out it's missing a medal, a vital part to make a Medabot work. However, a strange mysterious man called the Phantom Renegade gives a medal to Ikki's father and tells him he should give it to his son. Now Ikki will finally be able to also take part in Robattles and compete with other fellow Medafighters. But whoever loses the battle must submit one of their Medabot's Medaparts to the victor.

Gameplay
Gameplay is split into two different sections. One for the World Map, and another for Battles. When travelling around the World Map you can find random encounters with other Medafighters. When encountering another Medafighter; it is set in a 3-v-3 Battle with a unique battle system, with each Medabot having four different actions (Head parts have a finite amount of ammo, the Medabot will cease to function once its head is destroyed. R.Arm and L.Arm parts have infinite amount of ammo and can be used repeatedly until destroyed. Legs can affect the movement of your Medabot based on the terrain within a battle and build up the Medaforce meter). The way to act in battle is different compared to other RPGs, targeting a certain Medabot part and Medabot is usually randomized but can be avoided by using certain Medaparts that aim at certain parts, and the speed of your Medabot is dependent on the Leg Medaparts it has and the terrain it is battling on. The battle is over when the "Leader" Medabot's head is destroyed. Some encounters such as the Rubberobo Gang for example; will give you Rubberobo Medals for you to use to escape from battles. You earn experience points, Medaparts and money by winning battles. You can customize your Medabot with Medaparts, which can be won from other medafighters or bought in shops.

Reception
Marcel van Duyn of Nintendo Life gave it a retrospective rating of 6/10.

References

Natsume (company) games
Video games about robots
2002 video games
Game Boy Advance games
Video game remakes
Video games developed in Japan
Video games with alternative versions
Virtual Console games
Virtual Console games for Wii U
Multiplayer and single-player video games